David Ayres (born August 12, 1977) is a Canadian former professional ice hockey goaltender and current head coach of the Port Perry Lumberjacks of the Provincial Junior Hockey League. Ayres is also the oldest NHL goaltender to win his regular season debut.

While working as a building operator for the Toronto Maple Leafs, Ayres became the Carolina Hurricanes' emergency goaltender during a 2020 game against the Maple Leafs. Despite having never played in the NHL before and being 42 years of age, he and Carolina emerged victorious.  While the media widely reported that Ayres was the first emergency backup goaltender to record a National Hockey League (NHL) win, several amateur goaltenders did so in the days before teams carried two goaltenders, including Bill Dickie in 1942, André Binette in 1955 and Len Broderick in 1957.

Early and personal life
Ayres is a native of Whitby, Ontario, and grew up playing youth ice hockey and attending hockey camps in the town. His late father, Bob, and his brother, Chris, were also goaltenders. He became ill and required a kidney transplant (donated by his mother, Mary) in 2004. In 2017, Ayres married his wife, Sarah. In a social media post in 2022, Sarah announced that they have separated.

Ayres worked as a building operator at Ricoh Coliseum (now Coca-Cola Coliseum) in Toronto, which is the home arena for the Toronto Marlies, the American Hockey League farm team of the Toronto Maple Leafs. His job responsibilities occasionally included maintenance and operating an ice resurfacer, which gave him the "Zamboni driver" moniker used in news articles about his NHL debut. The Marlies equipment man found out he was a goalie and coach, so head coach Sheldon Keefe started using him as a goaltender at practice when an extra man was needed, as did the Maple Leafs.

Hockey career
Ayres played eight games with the Norwood Vipers of the Allan Cup Hockey League in 2014. As a goaltender, he allowed 58 goals, had a .777 save percentage and an 0–8 record. Ayres has served as a backup to both the Toronto Marlies and Charlotte Checkers in the American Hockey League (AHL), the primary affiliates of the Toronto Maple Leafs and Carolina Hurricanes, respectively.

NHL appearance
On February 22, 2020, both of the Carolina Hurricanes' goaltenders, James Reimer and Petr Mrázek, were injured during a game against the Maple Leafs. Ayres entered the game during the second period as the emergency backup goaltender, after signing a one-game contract with the NHL. Donning Kasimir Kaskisuo's old Toronto Marlies helmet and pads, and wearing a Maple Leafs t-shirt under his equipment, he entered the game at 8:41 left in the 2nd period with a 3–1 lead. He allowed goals on the first two shots that he faced before stopping the next eight shots on goal, along with recording one shot on goal, to help seal a 6–3 win for Carolina. He became the first emergency backup to enter a game in the NHL since Scott Foster in 2018. The Carolina Hurricanes sprayed water after the game on Ayres with the water bottles in the locker room. Ayres also became the oldest goaltender (at 42 years, 194 days) to win his NHL regular-season debut, and for this, the Hockey Hall of Fame was given his game-used goalie stick. The record had been held by Hugh Lehman since 1927 at 41 years 21 days.

Ayres was named first star of the game and kept his game-worn jersey and game puck. Had he signed a Professional Try-Out Agreement, he would have been paid $500 for the game, but Ayres said after the game that under the terms of his contract he was not paid. Reimer also gave him an autographed goalie stick, and Rod Brind'Amour, Carolina's coach, gave Ayres an autographed bottle of wine. His debut occurred on the 40th anniversary of the Miracle on Ice. Carolina Hurricanes' forward Sebastian Aho stated teammates pooled together and gave Ayres a little bit of money. Ontario Premier Doug Ford called Ayres to congratulate him on his performance.

Following the game, the Carolina Hurricanes announced that they would be selling t-shirts with Ayres' name and jersey number 90, with royalties going to Ayres and a portion of the proceeds being donated to a kidney foundation of Ayres' choice.

Ayres was invited to sound the siren at the start of the Carolina Hurricanes home game, on February 25. While in North Carolina, Governor Roy Cooper declared Ayres, a Canadian citizen, an honorary citizen of the state of North Carolina, and Raleigh honoured him by naming February 25, 2020, "David Ayres Day" in the City of Raleigh.

Post-hockey career
On October 5, 2021, it was announced that David Ayres had joined the CBD company CaniBrands as a brand ambassador.

On October 26, 2021, the Carolina Hurricanes announced that James Corden would produce a movie based on David Ayres’ story that would become a Disney feature film. It is also expected that David Ayres will play himself in several scenes of the movie.

Ayres made his coaching debut as head coach of the Southern Professional Hockey League’s Vermilion County Bobcats on April 7, 2022 against the Evansville Thunderbolts at the Ford Center, but was replaced by season's end.

Career statistics

Regular season

See also
 Jorge Alves – Carolina Hurricanes equipment manager who played as a backup goalie for his team on December 31, 2016
 Matt Berlin – Backup goalie and college student who played for the Edmonton Oilers on January 28, 2023
 Scott Foster (ice hockey) – Backup goalie and accountant who played for the Chicago Blackhawks in 2017 and saved all seven shots faced
 Tom Hodges – Backup goalie and life insurance salesman who played for the Anaheim Ducks on April 30, 2022
 Lester Patrick – former New York Rangers coach who, at age 44, played in the 1928 Stanley Cup Finals for the team as an emergency goalie
List of players who played only one game in the NHL

References

External links
 
 Honorary Citizenship Proclamation for David Ayres by Governor Roy Cooper

1977 births
Living people
Canadian ice hockey goaltenders
Carolina Hurricanes players
Ice hockey people from Ontario
Kidney transplant recipients
Maple Leaf Sports & Entertainment
Sportspeople from Whitby, Ontario
Undrafted National Hockey League players